is one of the 35 former wards of Tokyo-Fu, Tokyo City.  On October 1, 1932, the towns of Yodobashi, Okubo, Totsuka, and Ochiai were merged into Yodobashi ward.  In 1947, it was merged with Yotsuya and Ushigome wards of Tokyo City to form the present-day Shinjuku ward.  It covered  and 51,090 people as of October 1, 1945, shortly after the end of World War II and after mass loss of population due to Bombing of Tokyo.  Yodobashi Camera is a store with its name taken from the town and ward.

Dissolved municipalities of Tokyo
Populated places established in 1932
Populated places disestablished in 1947